Charles Burleigh Purvis (April 14, 1842 – December 14, 1929) was a physician in Washington, D.C. He was among the founders of the medical school at Howard University. He was the first black physician to attend a sitting president when he attended President James Garfield after he was shot by an assassin in 1881. Purvis was the first black physician to head a hospital under civilian authority, when he was appointed as surgeon-in-charge of the Freedmen's Hospital that same year. He was the first black person to serve on the D. C. Board of Medical Examiners and the second black instructor at an American medical school. He was also a leading activist in civil rights and universal suffrage movements.

Early life 

Purvis was born in Philadelphia on April 14, 1842. Purvis's parents were abolitionists Robert Purvis and Harriet Forten Purvis, both free people of color. When he was two years old, the family moved to Byberry, a suburb of Philadelphia. Charles was the fifth of eight children and worked on the farm as a young man.

He attended some public schools, but most of his schooling was with the Quakers. He enrolled at Oberlin in 1860 and stayed for two years but did not finish. In 1862 he entered the Medical College at Western Reserve in Cleveland.

Medical career 

In 1864 Purvis served in the Union Army in the US Civil War as a military nurse at Camp Barker, which became a model for Freedmen's hospital. He graduated from Western Reserve in March 1865, where he completed medical training. Two months after graduation he took the position of acting assistant surgeon with a rank of first lieutenant and was assigned to duty in Washington, DC.  He served in this role until 1869.

On June 9, 1869, Purvis and Alexander Thomas Augusta were proposed for membership of the Medical Society of DC, a branch of the American Medical Association. They were considered eligible, but did not receive enough votes. Another black physician, A. W. Tucker, was proposed on June 23, but was also rejected. In response, these three formed the National Medical Society, made up of African Americans.

Purvis and Alexander T. Augusta were among the founders of Howard University Medical School. In the fall of 1868, Purvis was elected professor of materia medica and medical jurisprudence, a position which he held for five years. He next was appointed as chair of obstetrics and diseases of women and children. That year he was elected secretary to the Medical Faculty. Purvis was very successful at Howard, and was credited with keeping the medical department running during the financial panic of 1873.

He attended President Garfield after he was shot by an assassin on July 2, 1881. This made him the first black physician to attend to a sitting president. Later in 1881 Purvis was appointed by President Chester Arthur as Surgeon-in-Charge at the Freedmen's hospital, serving from October 1, 1881, to 1894. In that role, he was the first black person to head a hospital under civilian authority. In a letter from 1908, Purvis said he believed he was removed by the Secretary of the Interior Hoke Smith in favor of a Democrat after a change in administrations, which was customary for political appointees under the spoils system.

In 1904, Purvis was granted a license to practice in Massachusetts and admitted to the Massachusetts Medical Society. In 1905 he moved to Boston. Purvis resigned from the Howard University medical school on May 28, 1907. He was appointed professor emeritus on January 21, 1908. Purvis' initial appointment at Howard was professor in the Medical Department in 1868. On May 24, 1908, he was elected a member of the Howard Board of trustees and served until his resignation on June 1, 1926.

Other activities 

In Washington, Purvis was close personal friends with many prominent leaders, including Frederick Douglass, Francis J. Grimke, Blanche K. Bruce, and Richard Theodore Greener. In 1881, Purvis joined James Monroe Gregory and George T. Downing in fighting against a proposed law before the U.S. House of Representatives that would create separate schools for black children. The trio created an organization to fight this discrimination. The group gathered many leading civil rights figures, having Frederick Douglass as president, Richard T. Greener as secretary, and also including Frederick G. Barbadoes, John F. Cook, Francis James Grimké, Milton M. Holland, Wiley Lane, William H. Smith, Purvis, Downing, and Gregory. The group was supported by representative Dudley C. Haskell (R-KS) and succeeded in forestalling the proposal.

Purvis was a Mason. He was the first black person to serve on the D. C. Board of Medical Examiners and the second black instructor in an American Medical School. He was given a LL.D. Degree from Howard University in 1914.

Purvis, along with his father and many others, was active in feminist movements and calls for universal suffrage. Purvis was criticized for not identifying only with blacks, having light skin, marrying a white woman, and sending his daughter to white public schools in DC.

Purvis married Ann Hathaway on April 13, 1871. They had two children; Alice, who became a physician and Robert, who became a dentist. Purvis died in Los Angeles, California, on December 14, 1929.

References 

1842 births
1929 deaths
African-American activists
Physicians from Philadelphia
People from Washington, D.C.
Case Western Reserve University alumni
African-American physicians
American hospital administrators
Union Army officers
Massachusetts Republicans
Washington, D.C., Republicans
Forten family
20th-century African-American people